Instituto Nacional de Estadística may refer to:
Instituto Nacional de Estadística (Spain), the official organisation in Spain that collects statistics about Spanish society
National Institute of Statistics of Bolivia, a branch of the Government of Bolivia which collects factual data
National Statistics Institute (Chile), a state-run organization of the Government of Chile which publishes official demographic statistics
Instituto Nacional de Estadística (Honduras)
, an institute in Uruguay

See also
National Institute of Statistics (disambiguation)
National Institute of Statistics and Census (disambiguation)
Instituto Nacional de Estatística (disambiguation), in various lusophone countries
National Institute of Statistics, Geography and Data Processing, a Mexican government agency
Instituto Nacional de Estadística e Informática, a Peruvian government agency
INE (disambiguation)